Graduate Hotels is a collection of hotels located in college towns across the country, launched in 2014 by Nashville-based real estate company AJ Capital Partners.  Each hotel reflects the culture and charm of the nearby university.  There are currently 33 operating hotels in the United States and two in England.

History 
Graduate Hotels was founded in 2014 by Nashville-based real estate investor Ben Weprin and his firm, AJ Capital Partners.  The company launched the Graduate Hotels brand by acquiring and remodeling hotels in university-anchored towns across the country. The first hotel opened in Athens, Georgia in 2014, centered around the University of Georgia.

Locations

United States

England

Future

References

External links
 Official website

Hotels in the United States
Hotel chains in the United States
Hotels established in 2014
Companies based in Nashville, Tennessee